was a Japanese professor of electrical engineering.

Dr. Hiyamizu won the 1982 Japanese Journal of Applied Physics Paper Award as lead author of a paper on mobility in two-dimensional electron gases while at Fujitsu Laboratories Limited, received the 1990 IEEE Morris N. Liebmann Memorial Award with Takashi Mimura "for outstanding contributions to the epitaxial growth of compound semiconductor materials and devices," and in 2001 was named an IEEE Fellow "for contributions to the realization of the first high electron mobility transistor (HEMT)". He served as dean of the Osaka University Graduate School of Engineering from 2000 to 2002. He died in February 2019 at the age of 75.

Notes

References 
 Satoshi Hiyamizu et al., "Extremely High Mobility of Two-Dimensional Electron Gas in Selectively Doped GaAs/N-AlGaAs Heterojunction Structures Grown by MBE", Jpn. J. Appl. Phys. Vol.20 (1981) Pt.2 No.4, pp. L245-L248.
 IEEE Morris N. Liebmann Memorial Award recipients
 IEEE Fellow Class of 2001 
 IEEE Fellow Class of 2001 (Tokyo section)
 Osaka University Graduate School of Engineering - history

1943 births
2019 deaths
Japanese electrical engineers
Fellow Members of the IEEE
Osaka University alumni
Academic staff of Osaka University
People from Osaka